Lamar Dodd (September 22, 1909 - September 21, 1996) was a U.S. painter whose work reflected a love of the American South.

Early life and education 
Born in Fairburn, Georgia, to Rev. Francis Jefferson Dodd and Etta Cleveland (Ed Dodd, creator of the Mark Trail comic strip, was his first cousin) and reared in LaGrange, Georgia, Dodd trained in the South, including a short stay at Georgia Tech in Atlanta.

Career 
He taught art in Alabama before traveling to New York City to study under advocates of the Ashcan School of painting as well as to gain a nativist perspective from the paintings of artists such as Thomas Hart Benton. He specifically studied under the draughtsman George Bridgman and the painter George Luks. He returned to Birmingham, Alabama, determined to champion local art. Over a long and productive career his styles encompassed naturalism and expressionism and extended to abstract art.

Dodd was also a university teacher and administrator. Appointed as an artist in residence at the University of Georgia, in Athens, in 1937, he became the head of the art department several years later. Dodd consolidated art instruction into a unified department and initiated a master's degree program. The Lamar Dodd School of Art at the University of Georgia is named in his memory. Dodd became a full member of the National Academy of Design in 1954, and was a member of the Sigma Chi fraternity. In 1958 his painting Cathedral Number 1 was acquired for the collection at Lehigh University by prominent alumnus Ralf Wilson after it was shown in a contemporary art exhibition curated by Francis J. Quirk.

References
History of the University of Georgia, Thomas Walter Reed, Imprint: Athens, Georgia : University of Georgia, ca. 1949, pp. 3026-3033

External links
Lamar Dodd School of Art website
Lamar Dodd at the New Georgia Encyclopedia
Hodgson-Dodd Park historical marker (side 1)
Hodgson-Dodd Park historical marker (side 2)

1909 births
1996 deaths
Georgia Tech alumni
University of Georgia faculty
20th-century American painters
American male painters
Artists from Georgia (U.S. state)
People from Fairburn, Georgia
National Academy of Design members
20th-century American male artists